The rufous-banded miner (Geositta rufipennis) is a species of bird in the family Furnariidae.

It is found in Argentina, Bolivia, and Chile. Its natural habitats are subtropical or tropical high-altitude shrubland and subtropical or tropical high-altitude grassland.

References

rufous-banded miner
Birds of the Southern Andes
Birds of Bolivia
Birds of Argentina
rufous-banded miner
Taxonomy articles created by Polbot